Mehmet Reşat Nayır (13 July 1911 – 25 October 1992) was a Turkish footballer. He competed in the men's tournament at the 1936 Summer Olympics.

References

External links
 

1911 births
1992 deaths
Turkish footballers
Turkey international footballers
Olympic footballers of Turkey
Footballers at the 1936 Summer Olympics
Place of birth missing
Association football midfielders